Thicke is an Old English Surname, and derives from a nickname thick, someone who was plump or fat. that may refer to:

 Alan Thicke, Canadian actor, songwriter, comedian, game and talk show host
 Robin Thicke, American singer, songwriter and record producer
 Sir Hardin Thicke, fictional British presenter of the Master Tape Theatre radio show
 Todd Thicke, Canadian television writer and producer

See also
 
 
 Thicke of the Night, American late night talk show 
 Thick (disambiguation)